Ripamonti is an Italian surname.

List of people with the surname 

 Camillo Ripamonti (1919–1997), Italian politician
 Giuseppe Ripamonti (1573–1643), Italian historian
 Macarena Ripamonti (born 1991), Chilean politician
 Manuel Luis Pellegrini Ripamonti (born 1953), Chilean football manager
 Maria Ripamonti (1909–1954), Italian nun
 Nicola Ripamonti (born 1990), Italian canoeist
 Umberto Ripamonti (born 1895), Italian cyclist

See also 

 Julio Ripamonti Base
 Rigamonti

Surnames
Surnames of Italian origin
Italian-language surnames